Mohammed Deham Al-Sowaidi (born 25 June 1962) is a Qatari football defender who played for Qatar in the 1984 Asian Cup.

References

External links
Profile at Sports-reference.com
Stats

1962 births
Living people
Qatari footballers
Qatar international footballers
Qatar Stars League players
Olympic footballers of Qatar
Footballers at the 1984 Summer Olympics
1984 AFC Asian Cup players
Footballers at the 1986 Asian Games
1988 AFC Asian Cup players
Association football defenders
Asian Games competitors for Qatar